David Forbes may refer to:

David Forbes (British Army officer) (1777?–1849), Scottish soldier
David McHattie Forbes (1863–1937), Scottish agriculturalist, and plantation manager, judge, explorer in the territory of Hawaii
David Forbes (mineralogist) (1828–1876), British mineralogist
David Forbes, singer for Canadian band Boulevard
David Forbes (sailor) (1934–2022), Australian Olympic sailor
David Forbes (politician) (born 1956),  Canadian provincial politician
Dave Forbes (born 1948), retired Canadian ice hockey player

See also 
David Forbes Hendry (born 1944), British economist
David Forbes Martyn (1906–1970), Scottish-Australian physicist
Forbes (name)